Water polo was contested at the 2013 Summer Universiade from July 5 to 17 in Kazan, Russia.

Medal summary

Medal table

Medal events

Men

Twelve teams participated in the men's tournament.

Teams

Pool A

Pool B

Women

Eight teams participated in the women's tournament.

Teams

Pool A

Pool B

References

External links
2013 Summer Universiade – Water polo
Results book

 
2013
U
2013 Summer Universiade events
Universiade